Mus musculus domesticus, the Western European house mouse, is a subspecies of the house mouse (Mus musculus). Some laboratory mouse strains, such as C57BL/6, are domesticated from M. m. domesticus.

Distribution
In Europe, M. m. domesticus lives in Western and Northern Europe, while another subspecies, the Eastern European house mouse (M. m. musculus) lives in Eastern and Southern Europe. The area from Scandinavia to the Black Sea is a secondary hybrid zone for M. m. domesticus and M. m. musculus. Habitats of M. m. domesticus also exist in the Middle East, Southern Asia, North Africa, North America, and some areas of Latin America and Oceania.

Relations with humans
M. m. domesticus is harmful to humans, for they can damage vegetation and field crops. It is also one of many invasive species.

References 

Mus (rodent)